"¿De Dónde Sacas Eso?" is a song written and recorded by the American musical duo Ha*Ash and is the ninth track from Ha*Ash's fourth studio album A Tiempo. where it was released as the fourth single from the album on July 11, 2012, and then included on their live album Ha*Ash: En Vivo (2019). It was written by Ashley Grace, Hanna Nicole and José Luis Ortega.

Background and release 
"¿De Dónde Sacas Eso?" was written by Ashley Grace, Hanna Nicole and José Luis Ortega while its production was done by Michele Canova. Is a song recorded by American duo Ha*Ash from her fourth studio album A Tiempo (2011). It was released as the fourth single from the album on July 11, 2012, by Sony Music Entertainment.

Commercial performance 
It peaked at #4 and #9 on Billboard Mexican Singles Chart, and at number #3 in the Monitor Latino. In 2014 the song was certified gold in Mexico.

Music video 
The first music video for "¿De Dónde Sacas Eso?", recorded live for the album A Tiempo Edition Deluxe, was released on August 1, 2011. , the video has over 58 million views on YouTube.

The music video for was released on July 11, 2012 on the Ha*Ash's YouTube and the other video channels. , the video has over 8 million views on YouTube.

The third video for "¿De Dónde Sacas Eso?", recorded live for the live album Ha*Ash: En Vivo, was released on December 6, 2019. The video was filmed in Auditorio Nacional, Mexico City.

Credits and personnel 
Credits adapted from AllMusic and Genius.

Recording and management

 Recording Country: United States
 Sony / ATV Discos Music Publishing LLC / Westwood Publishing
 (P) 2011 Sony Music Entertainment México, S.A. De C.V. (studio version)

Ha*Ash
 Ashley Grace  – vocals, guitar, songwriting
 Hanna Nicole  – vocals, guitar, songwriting
Additional personnel
 José Luis Ortega  – songwriting
 Michele Canova  – director, arranger 
 Aaron Sterling  – drums

Charts

Certifications

Awards and nominations

Release history

References 

Ha*Ash songs
Songs written by Ashley Grace
Songs written by Hanna Nicole
Songs written by José Luis Ortega
Song recordings produced by Michele Canova
2011 songs
2012 singles
Spanish-language songs
Pop ballads
Sony Music Latin singles